Bird-in-Hand or Bird in Hand may refer to:
Bird-in-Hand, Pennsylvania, a census-designated place (CDP) in Lancaster County, Pennsylvania, United States
Bird-in-Hand Hotel, a historic hotel built in 1852
Bird in Hand winery near Woodside in the Adelaide Hills of South Australia, Australia
Bird-in-Hand mine a historic gold mine after which the winery is named
Bird in Hand (painting),  a painting by Ellen Gallagher, in the collection of the Tate Modern in London, United Kingdom